Prospeed Competition is a sports car racing team based in Liège, Belgium. It was founded in 2006 by Rudi Penders and Luc Goris. It has been a factory-supported Porsche team since 2008.

The team debuted in the 2006 Belcar Endurance Championship, where it won the 2011 and 2012 drivers championships and the 2009 24 Hours of Zolder.

In 2008, the team entered the FIA GT Championship with a GT2 class Porsche 911 driven by Richard Westbrook and Emmanuel Collard and another for Markus Palttala and Mikael Forsten. The team finished third in the teams standings and Westbrook took third place in the drivers standings. Prospeed claiming the 2009 GT2 drivers title with Richard Westbrook but finished second in the teams standings with Marco Holzer and Paul van Splunteren.

In 2010, after the dismissal of the GT2 class of the FIA GT Championship, the team moved to the Le Mans Series with a GT2-class Porsche 911 run by Westbrook and Holzer. The best result was a second place at Silverstone and ended 12th in the teams championship. The team also fielded an all-amateur car at the 24 Hours of Le Mans.

Westbrook was replaced by Marc Goossens in the 2011 Le Mans Series. The duo finished 13th in the GT2 drivers championship and Prospeed finished sixth in the GT2 teams championship. They also finished 8th in the GTE-Pro class at the 24 Hours of Le Mans, with Jaap van Lagen as third driver. The team won the GTE-Am class of the 2012 6 Hours of Castellet, but did not compete at the remaining European Le Mans Series races. Later they raced at the 24 Hours of Le Mans with a GTE-Am entry headed by Sean Edwards, which retired at mid race.

Prospeed also competed at the FIA GT3 European Championship, where it won the 2010 teams title and finished vice-champion in the drivers title with Marco Holzer and Paul van Splunteren. They also fielded two cars in 2011, when the best lineup finished 19th in the standings with two wins.

Prospeed returned to the 2011 24 Hours of Spa also with two Porsche 911 cars: a Pro entry headlined by Goossens and a Pro-Am, both of which retired. The team joined the full Blancpain Endurance Series for 2012 with a Pro car for Goosens, Xavier Maassen and Marc Hennerici, and a Pro-Am car. The Pro car won a race and finished third in the teams championship, whereas the drivers ended 7th behind the two leading WRT and Marc VDS driver lineups.

External links

 

Belgian auto racing teams
Auto racing teams established in 2006
2006 establishments in Belgium
FIA GT Championship teams
European Le Mans Series teams
Blancpain Endurance Series teams
FIA World Endurance Championship teams
24 Hours of Le Mans teams
ADAC GT Masters teams
British GT Championship teams